The Access All Areas Tour (advertised as the Access All Areas: North American Tour) was the second concert tour by supergroup, The AAA Girls. The group is composed of RuPaul's Drag Race alums: Courtney Act, Willam Belli and Alaska Thunderfuck. The tour supports the group's debut EP, Access All Areas (2017). Beginning fall 2017, the tour played 15 cities in North America.

Background

The tour was announced August 2017, a month after the release of their EP. Produced by Fullscreen Live, the tour played 15 cities in the United States and Canada. The show was promoted as a full production with full staging, costume changes and choreography. As a thank you, the group live called fans, on Instagram, who purchased tickets. The Squared Division served are creative directors and Jae Fusz serves as choreographer. Rehearsals began September 10, 2017 at CenterStaging in Burbank. Backstage footage is chronicled on each of the members YouTube channels: the "After Show", "Courtney Chronicles" and "Billium's Wheatdown". 

Group member Courtney Act described the concert as "not a typical drag show". She states: "We're creating a really cool concert experience that hasn't really been seen before by 'Drag Race' fans. A lot of the shows that tour with these bigger venues are the girls doing the regular numbers that they would do in a club on a theater stage. This is like, production numbers—we've got costumes and choreography. Most of the music is original, but we have some parodies that we do as well. It's more on the side of a concert than a variety show, which [fans] are normally used to. It's going to be really unique." 

Proceeds from the show in Houston went towards relief for Hurricane Harvey.

Setlist
The following setlist was obtained from the September 21, 2017 concert; held at Fitzgerald's in Houston, Texas. It does not represent all concerts for the duration of the tour.
AAA Girls
"AAA"
"A Lacefront Like This"
"Tuck Tape"
Willam
"Glamorous" / "The Glamorous Life"
"Work from Home" / "Work" / "Work Bitch" / "Work" / "She Works Hard for the Money" 
AAA Girls
"When the Water Runs Clear"
"Dear Uber Driver"
"Pride or Die"
Courtney
"Chandelier" / "Diamonds" / "Titanium"
Alaska & Willam
"Did You Have to Use Your Finger?" / "Hole Too Open" / "Breed Me" / "Big Black Dick"
AAA Girls
"It's All Over"
"Power" / "No Scrubs" / "Jumpin', Jumpin'" / "Wannabe"
Alaska
"Valentina"
AAA Girls
"Heather?"
"Meet & Greet"
Encore
"American Apparel Ad Girls"

Notes

"A Lacefront Like This" is a parody of "A Moment Like This"
"Tuck Tape" is a parody of the theme song for DuckTales
"Dear Uber Driver" is a parody of "Dear Future Husband"
"Did You Have to Use Your Finger?" is a parody of "Linger"
"Hole Too Open" is a parody of "Oklahoma"
"Breed Me" is a parody of "Greedy"
"Big Black Dick" is a parody of "Black Magic"
"Valentina" is a parody of "Despacito"
"Heather?" is a parody of "We Belong Together"
"American Apparel Ad Girls"  is a parody of "Farrah Fawcett Hair"

Tour dates

Cancellations and rescheduled shows

References

2017 concert tours